The 2018 Lakes Region 200 was the 18th stock car race of the 2018 NASCAR Xfinity Series season, and the 29th iteration of the event. The race was held on Saturday, July 21, 2018, in Loudon, New Hampshire, at New Hampshire Motor Speedway a 1.058 miles (1.703 km) permanent, oval-shaped, low-banked racetrack. The race took the scheduled 200 laps to complete. At race's end, Christopher Bell of Joe Gibbs Racing would pit for four tires on the final round of pit stops compared to second-place finisher's Team Penske driver Brad Keselowski, who only took two tires. The strategy for Bell proved to be a winning strategy for Bell, as he would hold off Keselowski for the win to win his fourth career NASCAR Xfinity Series win, his third of the season, and his second consecutive win in the series. To fill out the podium, Ryan Preece of Joe Gibbs Racing would finish third.

Background 

New Hampshire Motor Speedway is a 1.058-mile (1.703 km) oval speedway located in Loudon, New Hampshire, which has hosted NASCAR racing annually since the early 1990s, as well as the longest-running motorcycle race in North America, the Loudon Classic. Nicknamed "The Magic Mile", the speedway is often converted into a 1.6-mile (2.6 km) road course, which includes much of the oval.

The track was originally the site of Bryar Motorsports Park before being purchased and redeveloped by Bob Bahre. The track is currently one of eight major NASCAR tracks owned and operated by Speedway Motorsports.

Entry list

Practice

First practice 
The first practice session was held on Friday, July 20, at 1:05 PM EST, and would last for 50 minutes.

Second and final practice 
The second and final practice session, sometimes referred to as Happy Hour, was held on Friday, July 20, at 3:05 PM EST, and would last for 50 minutes.

Qualifying 
Qualifying was held on Saturday, July 21, at 11:05 AM EST. Since New Hampshire Motor Speedway is under 2 miles (3.2 km), the qualifying system was a multi-car system that included three rounds. The first round was 15 minutes, where every driver would be able to set a lap within the 15 minutes. Then, the second round would consist of the fastest 24 cars in Round 1, and drivers would have 10 minutes to set a lap. Round 3 consisted of the fastest 12 drivers from Round 2, and the drivers would have 5 minutes to set a time. Whoever was fastest in Round 3 would win the pole.

No drivers would fail to qualify.

Full qualifying results

Race results 
Stage 1 Laps: 45

Stage 2 Laps: 45

Stage 3 Laps: 110

References 

2018 NASCAR Xfinity Series
NASCAR races at New Hampshire Motor Speedway
July 2018 sports events in the United States
2018 in sports in New Hampshire